National Highway 163 (previously NH 202) is a National Highway in India that links Kodangal(Ravulapally) in Telangana and Bhopalpatnam road in Chhattisgarh Via major cities like Hyderabad, Jangaon, Bhuvanagiri, Kazipet, Hanamkonda, Warangal. It was renumbered as NH 163. Currently there was a proposal for extension of NH 163 Pre-starting point (i.e., Kodangal Karnataka border) to Hyderabad.

Route 
Many cities and towns in various districts in the States of Telangana and Chhattisgarh are connected by National Highway 163.

Route length in states:
 Telangana: 
 Chhattisgarh:

Connecting

References

202
202
National highways in India